Alexander Leslie-Melville, 7th Earl of Leven (7 November 1749 – 22 February 1820) was a Scottish Whig politician and peer.

As the eldest son of David Melville, 6th Earl of Leven, he succeeded his father as Earl of Leven and Earl of Melville on 9 June 1802. Between 1806 and 1807 he sat in the House of Lords as a Scottish representative peer.

Family
On 12 August 1784 he married Jane Thornton (11 February 1757 – 13 February 1818), daughter of John Thornton, and they had five sons and three daughters:
 David Leslie-Melville, 8th Earl of Leven (22 June 1785 – 8 October 1860), married Elizabeth Anne Campbell, daughter of Sir Archibald Campbell, 2nd Baronet, of Succoth, and had issue
 John Thornton Leslie-Melville, 9th Earl of Leven (18 December 1786 – 16 September 1876), married firstly his first cousin Harriet Thornton, daughter of Samuel Thornton, and had issue, and secondly his first cousin Sophia Thornton, daughter of Henry Thornton, and had further issue
 The Hon. William Henry Leslie-Melville (1788 – 1856)
 The Hon. and Rev. Robert Samuel Leslie-Melville (d. 24 October 1826)
 The Hon. Alexander Leslie-Melville (18 June 1800 – 19 November 1881) of Branston Hall, married Charlotte Smith, daughter of Samuel Smith, and had issue
 Lady Lucy Leslie-Melville (d. 23 December 1865), married Henry Smith, son of Samuel Smith, and had issue
 Lady Jane Elizabeth Leslie-Melville (d. 25 April 1848), married Francis Pym, son of Francis Pym, and had issue
 Lady Marianne Leslie-Melville (d. 22 March 1823), married Abel Smith, son of Samuel Smith, no issue.

References
Burke's Peerage 107th edition
https://web.archive.org/web/20110105091532/http://www.cracroftspeerage.co.uk/online/content/Leven1641.htm

External links
   (which uses a different system of nomenclature)
 

1749 births
1820 deaths
Scottish representative peers
Earls of Leven